The 2020 Munster Senior Hurling League was the fifth staging of the Munster Senior Hurling League since its establishment by the Munster Council in 2016. The league began on 15 December 2019 and ended on 11 January 2020.

Clare were the defending champions, however, they failed to make it out of the group stage.

On 11 January 2020, Limerick won the Munster League after a 1-32 to 0-20 defeat of Cork in the final at the LIT Gaelic Grounds. This was their second league title overall and their first title since 2018.

Competition format

The six teams are drawn into two groups of three teams. Each team plays the other teams in their group once, earning 2 points for a win and 1 for a draw. The two group winners advance to the final. If the final is a draw, a penalty shoot-out is used to decide the winner; there is no extra time played.

Fixtures and results

Group 1

Table

Fixtures and results

Group 2

Table

Fixtures and results

Final

League statistics

Top scorers

Top scorers overall

Top scorers in a single game

References

Munster Senior Hurling League
Munster Senior Hurling League